Digital repatriation is the return of items of cultural heritage in a digital format to the communities from which they originated. The term originated from within anthropology, and typically referred to the creation of digital photographs of ethnographic material, which would then be made available to members of the originating culture. However, the term has also been applied to museum, library, and archives collections, and can refer not only to digital photographs of items, but also digital collections and virtual exhibits including 3D scans and audio recordings. Intangible cultural heritage, which includes traditional skills and knowledge, can also be digitally repatriated to communities.

Digital repatriation is becoming increasingly relevant as more cultural institutions make their collections available online. This increased access is sometimes at odds with the desires of the originating culture, since it limits their ability to curate and define terms of access to their cultural materials. Many cultural institutions are making efforts to involve communities in collection display and description. Recently, some cultural heritage institutions are also making the effort to return control and access of digital materials to original cultures. This has led to the development of digital software and tools to help achieve these goals.

Digital surrogates
Proponents of digital surrogacy argue that it can offer benefits to originating cultures, scholars, and educators. For originating cultures, digital surrogates can make cultural objects accessible to dispersed populations, reunite collections of physically scattered objects, or provide access to objects for which physical repatriation is challenging. Digital surrogates can provide an interactive experience for community members and inspire new community engagement with cultural objects. High quality digital surrogates can aid with preservation of the original objects, provide documentation for collections management, and give scholars access to the surrogates for continued study regardless of where the original artifacts are located. However, scholars caution that digital surrogates are alternative representations of an object, rather than replacements for the original objects.

Intangible Heritage 
Intangible Cultural Heritage includes recordings of songs, ceremonies, and stories. Cultural, esoteric, and traditional ecological knowledge are all forms of intangible cultural heritage, as well as genetic information. Oftentimes, intangible heritage contains culturally sensitive information that Indigenous communities want to personally manage. The digitization of intangible cultural heritage helps preserve the ways of life and traditions of diverse cultures around the world. Digitally repatriating traditional and esoteric knowledge returns this information to Indigenous communities, who can work with cultural heritage institutions to more accurately preserve materials and information. However, some Indigenous communities have concerns regarding the digitization and repatriation of this type of cultural heritage. Many communities believe that non-Native organizations are not respecting their rights and views of how this information is being handled, as having culturally sensitive materials publicly available online opens it up to intellectual misappropriation.

Ethical considerations 
Repatriation is fraught with ethical and legal challenges regarding ownership of artifacts and materials. Communities within originating cultures seeking to assert ownership over artifacts and materials held in outside institutions may lack the types of documentation that would be accepted in international courts of law, and they may have traditions and beliefs which conflict with Western understandings of individual intellectual property rights. While digital repatriation can provide access to objects for which physical repatriation is complicated or unlikely, originating cultures may not be satisfied with this option.

Institutions creating digital surrogates for digital repatriation may retain copies for institutional use, plus digital items can exist in multiple locations. Originating cultures may object to replicating or displaying sacred objects, objections which may extend to digital representations of the objects. This has led to problems surrounding who controls access to these digital materials, as many institutions retain the rights to these items. Some institutions have chosen to resolve this ethical challenge by requesting intellectual property rights clearance from the communities in question before publishing digital materials, and offering control over access permissions and representation of digital materials to members of the originating cultures. While digital repatriation projects can return control to Indigenous communities, this does not always happen. Indigenous peoples' control over their own cultural information is limited when non-Native institutions retain control, which can lead to Indigenous people not having a say in how their culture's knowledge and materials are used for research purposes. 

Unequal power dynamics have always existed between museums and Indigenous communities, especially in terms of oral history versus perspectives of colonists. Many cultural heritage institutions have perpetuated the idea that assimilation of Indigenous people was beneficial and peaceful. Historians, researchers, and curators should keep this in mind when discussing access and control with Indigenous communities.

Another consideration is where funds are invested to support digital repatriation projects. Trends show that grants are typically given to non-Native organizations over Indigenous communities that are working to preserve their collections. The Karuk people express that one of the biggest challenges is finding the funding to support their digital archive, Sípnuuk.

Software & Technology 
Digital repatriation relies heavily on the development of software and technology. These developments can benefit Indigenous communities by returning control to these groups and also by expanding access. Working with communities prior to digitizing materials can help determine digital access from the start. There are still barriers that exist with software and technology, such as the digital divide. Internet access and technology are not always feasible for some Indigenous communities, especially groups in remote locations or those who do not have adequate funds.

Mukurtu CMS 
Mukurtu CMS is a software specifically designed for managing and sharing digital heritage in culturally relevant and ethically minded ways. Originally designed in 2007 for the Warumungu people in Australia, Mukurtu CMS has become a popular tool for designing digital archives for Indigenous communities worldwide. This software is open sourced, meaning it is free and can be shaped to meet the needs of different communities. Mukurtu CMS places the needs and concerns of Indigenous communities at the forefront of its structure and function. It has options for expanded and multiple sets of metadata that are parallel to one another, meaning there is not a hierarchy or standard type of metadata.

Local Contexts 
This organization began in 2010 to address intellectual property and cultural heritage within Indigenous communities, particularly in a digital capacity. Through a combination of legal and educational options, Local Contexts helps shift cultural authority back to Indigenous communities. One of this organization's more prominent tools is the Local Contexts Traditional Knowledge Labels, or TK Labels, which institutions can utilize in digital collections to allow communities to designate certain material as restricted for access or use. There are currently eighteen labels that help control access. For example, the TK Secret/Sacred label lets users know that the material contains secret or sacred information. The labels are meant to be customizable to individual communities, allowing each community to define what a label means to them.

Examples
The National Museum of the American Indian (USA) and the Museum of New Zealand Te Papa Tongarewa have been particularly active in bicultural co-curation of digital material. There have also been several successful digital repatriation projects that enable Indigenous communities to manage their own digital materials, which helps limit who can access culturally sensitive materials.

Sípnuuk 
Launched in 2016, Sípnuuk originally started as a food security archive, with the intention of expanding to cover different topics important to the Karuk people. Even though they have maintained their culture and knowledge orally, the Karuk people recognized the importance of having a digital archive to gain sovereignty over their cultural heritage. Sípnuuk now has additional items pertaining to Karuk language, culture, skills, and traditional knowledge.

There is an effort to gain authority over Karuk cultural heritage both inside and outside of their community. The Sípnuuk staff work with families within their community to make recommendations about how to care for materials and also to get descriptive metadata directly from families donating knowledge or items to the archive. Because the Karuk people have complete control and authority over their digital archive, they can decide what metadata to use and how they want the public to access or use their materials. Having controlled vocabulary specific to their culture lets them include the names of items and places in both Karuk and English. To manage who has access to culturally sensitive materials located in Sípnuuk, a review committee appointed by the Karuk Tribal Council handles the requests of sensitive materials. The person or family requesting access to the material must sign a legal document once they are approved, outlining what they can and cannot do with access to the item or information.

Passamaquoddy Peoples' Knowledge Portal 
The Passamaquoddy digital archive was created in 2014 and took advantage of the Mukurtu software. The project originally started in the 1980s with the translation of wax cylinder recordings of the Passamaquoddy people made in 1890. By having these recordings digitally repatriated, the Passamaquoddy people were able to reconnect with their ancestors and learn their language, which had almost been completely lost within their community.

The focus of this archive is the transcription and translation of these recordings, but other parts of the Passamaquoddy culture and history are shared as well. The Passamaquoddy people wanted to be the cultural authorities of these recordings, which is why they decided to create an archive that their entire community can contribute to and access. This archive takes full advantage of the Local Contexts TK Labels to prevent the misuse of the Passamaquoddy cultural heritage, as a lot of the recordings are sacred ceremonies, or songs meant only for a certain gender or age group.

References

Digital photography
Ethnography